Madagascar is a 2005 American computer-animated survival comedy film produced by DreamWorks Animation and PDI/DreamWorks and distributed by DreamWorks Pictures. The film was directed by Eric Darnell and Tom McGrath (in his feature directorial debut) and written by Darnell, McGrath, Mark Burton, and Billy Frolick. The film stars the voices of Ben Stiller, Chris Rock, David Schwimmer, Jada Pinkett Smith, Sacha Baron Cohen, Cedric the Entertainer, and Andy Richter. It centers around a group of animals from the Central Park Zoo who find themselves stranded on the island of Madagascar.

Released on May 27, 2005, Madagascar received mixed reviews from critics but was a success at the box office, becoming the sixth highest-grossing film of 2005. Madagascar is the first entry in what would become the franchise of the same name, which includes the sequels Madagascar: Escape 2 Africa (2008) and Madagascar 3: Europe's Most Wanted (2012), as well as the spin-off film Penguins of Madagascar (2014); several short films, television series, and specials; and a number of video games, theme park attractions, and live stage shows.

Plot 
In New York City, Alex the lion is the star attraction of the Central Park Zoo, and spends time with his friends, Melman the giraffe, Gloria the hippopotamus, and his best friend Marty the zebra, who has grown bored with his daily routine and longs to experience the wild. On Marty's tenth birthday, Alex, Melman, and Gloria attempt to cheer him up, but Marty, still unsatisfied, learns that the zoo's penguins—Skipper, Kowalski, Rico, and Private—are trying to escape to Antarctica, and follows them out. Alex, Melman, and Gloria pursue Marty and attempt to convince him to return. The four, along with the penguins and two chimpanzees named Mason and Phil, converge at Grand Central Station, where the New York City police sedate them using tranquillizer guns. Under pressure from anti-captivity activists, the zoo is forced to ship the escaped animals by sea to a wildlife preserve in Kenya. During their travels, the penguins escape and take over the ship, intent on taking it to Antarctica. Their antics on the bridge cause the crates containing Alex, Marty, Melman, and Gloria to fall overboard and wash ashore on the island of Madagascar.

Arriving at Madagascar, the animals come across a pack of lemurs led by King Julien XIII. The predatory fossa attack the lemurs, but are scared off by Alex's fearsome appearance. Alex blames Marty for the group's predicament and attempts to signal for help to get back to civilization. Marty finds the wild to be exactly what he was looking for, and Gloria and Melman soon join him in enjoying the island. Alex eventually comes around, but without the raw steaks he was provided at the zoo, hunger sets in and his prey drive begins to show. Julien has the lemurs befriend the zoo animals in the hope that Alex's presence will keep the fossa at bay, despite his adviser Maurice's warnings about Alex's predatory nature. When Alex loses control and attacks Marty by biting him, he goes wild again and begins to chase Marty until Maurice throws a coconut at Alex to stop him. After realizing what he did and seeing himself as a monster, Alex runs off to the predator side of the island, where the fossa live and builds a cage resembling the one back at the zoo, feeling sad and guilty for attacking his friends. Seeing what Alex has become, and how dangerous the wild can be, Marty begins to regret his decision to leave the zoo.

The penguins, having found Antarctica to be inhospitable, land the ship at Madagascar. Seeing the chance to return Alex to New York, Marty crosses over to the predator side and attempts to convince the scared, starving Alex to return, but Alex refuses out of fear that he will attack Marty again. The fossa attack Marty, and though Gloria, Melman, and the penguins come to the rescue, they are outnumbered. Alex overcomes his predatory instincts, rescues his friends, and scares the fossa away from the lemur territory forever. The lemurs regain their respect for Alex, and the penguins satisfy his hunger by feeding him sushi, which he finds better than steak. As the lemurs throw a farewell celebration for the foursome, the penguins decide not to break the news that the ship has run out of fuel, thus leaving them stranded on the island.

Voice cast 

 Ben Stiller as Alex, a lion. Tom McGrath explained that "Ben Stiller was the first actor we asked to perform, and we knew we wanted his character, Alex, to be a big performing lion with a vulnerable side."
 Chris Rock as Marty, a plains zebra. McGrath explained the character: "Marty is a guy who thinks there might be more to life than what's in the zoo. We wanted his character to be energetic, so we listened to Chris Rock."
 David Schwimmer as Melman, a hypochondriac reticulated giraffe who is afraid of germs. When they were looking for a voice actor for Melman, they listened to Schwimmer's voice on Friends and, according to McGrath, thought that it "sounded really neat". During development, Melman the Giraffe was originally supposed to be an okapi but was changed to a giraffe.
 Jada Pinkett Smith as Gloria, a strong, confident, sweet hippopotamus. McGrath said that they found all these traits in Pinkett Smith's voice when they listened to her.
 Sacha Baron Cohen as King Julien XIII, a ring-tailed lemur and the king of the lemurs. King Julien was initially only meant to be a "two-line" character until auditioning Baron Cohen improvised eight minutes of dialogue in an Indian accent.
 Cedric the Entertainer as Maurice, an aye-aye and King Julien's royal advisor and best friend (to whom Julien never listens).
 Andy Richter as Mort, a Goodman's mouse lemur who is King Julien and Maurice's best friend.
 Tom McGrath as Skipper, the leader of the penguins. McGrath, who was also the film's co-director and co-writer, initially only lent his voice to the temporary tracks. Growing up with films starring tough actors like John Wayne, Charlton Heston, and Robert Stack, the latter of whom McGrath wanted for the voice of Skipper. Stack was approached about voicing the character, but died two weeks before production on the animation began. After that, DreamWorks Animation CEO Jeffrey Katzenberg decided to keep the temporary voice, with McGrath explaining: "People were used to me doing that voice. We knew it worked when we screened it." Many of the character's traits were based on Stack's work. McGrath especially emphasized The Untouchables, a 1959 television crime drama series starring Stack.
 Chris Miller as Kowalski, a penguin and Skipper's right hand.
 Miller also voices Timo, a tenrec who is only seen attending Julien's meeting.
 Jeffrey Katzenberg as Rico, a smart and silent penguin who is only expressed through grunts and squeals. Mireille Soria, the film's producer, commented on Katzenberg's uncredited role: "The irony for us is that he's the one who doesn't talk. There's something very Dadaistic about that, isn't there?"
 Katzenberg also voices Abner, a blue-eyed lemur who is only seen at the paradise scene.
 Christopher Knights as Private, an eager, lowly penguin. Knights was also an assistant editor on the film.
 Conrad Vernon as Mason, a chimpanzee (Phil, the other chimpanzee, is unvoiced).
 Eric Darnell and Tom McGrath as the fossa.
 Darnell also voices Hector and Horst, two lemurs.
 David P. Smith as Pancho, a crowned lemur.
 Smith also voices Becca, a black lemur and a spider.
Cody Cameron as Willie, a red lemur who is only seen attending Julien's meeting.
 Elisa Gabrielli as Nana, an elderly German-accented New Yorker. Gabrielli provided some background voices until the directors and producer asked her and her fellow actors if they wanted to try their voices for the role. Upon seeing a black and white sketch of Nana, Gabrielli knew that she wanted to voice her. She modeled Nana's voice after her Russian and Hungarian grandmothers and her stepfather, though she didn't think that her voice would be kept in the finished film at first.
 Bob Saget as an unspecified off-screen zoo animal.
 David Cowgill as a police horse.
 Stephen Apostolina as a police officer.

Production 

According to co-director Tom McGrath, the idea for Madagascar began as a one-sentence prompt, and it took two years of development for the idea to be refined to the point where the four main characters were finalized. In 1998, DreamWorks and PDI had started development on an animated film titled Rockumentary, which featured a Beatles-esque penguin rock band. The idea was scrapped, but after production on Madagascar started, director Eric Darnell decided to revive the penguins, albeit he retooled them as a commando unit rather than a rock band. In the original script Gloria was going to be pregnant due to being part of the zoo's breeding program and the baby was going to be born on the island and Melman, who is revealed to have a crush on Gloria would help raise the child like it was his own son. The idea was cut from the final version because the test audiences felt like the pregnancy plotline was too risky and mature for a family film especially young children who felt uncomfortable with the pairing of Melman and Gloria and may have gotten the film a PG-13 rating. However, the idea of Melman having a crush on Gloria was reused for the sequels. One of the lead characters was formerly to be an okapi. As a result, the character, Melman, was changed and played by a giraffe which is a more familiar animal. Originally, Julien was intended to be a minor character with only two lines. However, when Sacha Baron Cohen auditioned for the role, he improvised not only an Indian accent, but eight minutes of dialogue for his recording. The filmmakers found Cohen's performance so funny that they rewrote the script and made Julien a much more prominent character in the story as "King of the Lemurs". Dana Carvey was originally offered a role but he turned it down as he was busy raising kids at the time.

Home media 
Madagascar was released on DVD and VHS on November 15, 2005, by DreamWorks Home Entertainment. The DVD included a short animated film The Madagascar Penguins in a Christmas Caper, and a music video "I Like to Move It", featuring characters from the film dancing to the song. A Blu-ray version of the film was released on September 23, 2008.

The Madagascar - Movie Storybook was written by Billy Frolick and illustrated by Michael Koelsch, and was published by Scholastic in 2005. Koelsch also illustrated the Madagascar: Escape 2 Africa - Movie Storybook in 2008.

Reception

Box office 
The film was a commercial success. On its opening weekend, the film grossed $47,224,594 with a $11,431 average from 4,131 theaters making it the number 3 movie of that weekend behind Star Wars: Episode III – Revenge of the Sith and The Longest Yard. However, the film managed to claim the top position in the U.S. box office the following week with a gross of $28,110,235. In the United States, the film eventually grossed $193,595,521, and in foreign areas grossed $362,964,045 with a summative worldwide gross of $556,559,566.

Critical reception 
The consensus reads: "Though its story is problematic in spots and its humor is hit-or-miss for the adult crowd, Madagascar boasts impressive visuals and enough spunky charm to keep children entertained." On Metacritic, the film has a score of 57 out of 100, based on 36 reviews, indicating "mixed or average reviews". Audiences polled by CinemaScore gave the film an average grade of "A–" on an A+ to F scale.

Paul Arendt of BBC gave the film 4/5 stars, writing: "It's also a pleasure to see a cartoon so determinedly devoid of sentiment, a stance confirmed by the hilarious demise of an angelic little duckling. Highly recommended for kids and adults." Jeff Strickler of the Star Tribune gave the film 3/4 stars, describing it as a "good-natured kid flick" and writing: "This computer-animated comedy makes enough kowtows to adult humor that parents won't be bored, but it is clearly aimed at the peewee set." Ann Hornaday of The Washington Post described the film as "wildly fun" and wrote: "along with such recent classics as Shrek, Finding Nemo and The Incredibles, Madagascar will surely go on to take a deserved place on millions of families' video shelves as a reliable Saturday night staple." Kenneth Turan of the Los Angeles Times described the film as "a good-humored, pleasant confection that has all kinds of relaxed fun bringing computer-animated savvy to the old-fashioned world of Looney Tunes cartoons." Paul Clinton of CNN wrote that the film was "a delight", and added: "Co-writers and -directors McGrath and Eric Darnell, along with their entire team, have done a terrific job with their sweet and whimsical story."

Roger Ebert gave the film 2.5/4 stars, writing that it "is funny, especially at the beginning, and good-looking in a retro cartoon way", but added: "in a world where the stakes have been raised by Finding Nemo, Shrek and The Incredibles, it's a throwback to a more conventional kind of animated entertainment." Philippa Hawker of The Sydney Morning Herald also gave the film 2.5/4 stars, writing: "Madagascar, despite some break-out moments of silliness, seems defined by a formula that can't fail to please, at a basic level, but never feels imaginatively inspired." Rick Groen of The Globe and Mail gave the film 2/4 stars, describing the film's script as "a wafer-thin yarn that might have done Sylvester and Tweety proud, but goes missing-in-action when stretched over 80-plus minutes." A. O. Scott of The New York Times wrote that the film "arouses no sense of wonder, except insofar as you wonder, as you watch it, how so much talent, technical skill and money could add up to so little."

Awards 
The film has won three awards and several nominations.

In 2008, the American Film Institute nominated the film for its Top 10 Animation Films list.

Music 

Madagascar is the soundtrack to the 2005 DreamWorks film of the same name. It was released by Geffen Records on May 24, 2005. Of particular critical note was the cover of "I Like to Move It" by Sacha Baron Cohen, which has since become a recurring theme song throughout the Madagascar franchise.

The score was composed by frequent DreamWorks collaborator Hans Zimmer, with additional music by James Dooley, Heitor Pereira, James S. Levine, and Ryeland Allison. Zimmer also adapted John Barry's instrumental from "Born Free" into the score track of the same name; the Mormon Tabernacle Choir's cover of the song was used in the opening title sequence. Originally, Harry Gregson-Williams, another frequent DreamWorks collaborator, was supposed to compose the film's score. Louis Armstrong's song "What a Wonderful World" is used in the film.

Sequels and spin-offs 

A sequel, Madagascar: Escape 2 Africa, was released in 2008, followed by Madagascar 3: Europe's Most Wanted in 2012 and the spin-off film Penguins of Madagascar in 2014. The series has also spawned a number of television series, short films, video games, and other media, as well as theme park attractions and live stage shows.

Television series 
The animated television series entitled Madagascar: A Little Wild was aired, streaming on Peacock in 2020.

Spin-off series 
A spin-off series entitled The Penguins of Madagascar premiered on Nickelodeon in 2008.

Another spin-off series entitled All Hail King Julien premiered on Netflix in 2014.

References

External links 

 Official Website Official Website archived from the original on June 12, 2005
 
 

Madagascar (franchise) films
2005 comedy films
2005 animated films
2005 computer-animated films
2000s American animated films
2000s buddy comedy films
American buddy comedy films
American computer-animated films
Animated films about animals
DreamWorks Animation animated films
DreamWorks Pictures films
Films adapted into television shows
Films scored by Hans Zimmer
Films directed by Eric Darnell
Films directed by Tom McGrath
Films set in Madagascar
Animated films set in Manhattan
Films set in zoos
2005 directorial debut films
2005 films
2000s English-language films